The 1943 Paris–Roubaix was the 41st edition of the Paris–Roubaix, a classic one-day cycle race in France. The single day event was held on 25 April 1943 and stretched  from Paris to the finish at Roubaix Velodrome. The winner was Marcel Kint from Belgium.

Results

References

Paris–Roubaix
Paris–Roubaix
Paris–Roubaix
Paris–Roubaix